Tovil is a civil parish in the Borough of Maidstone, in Kent in the South East of England. It is a mixture of residential and industrial zoning, with an increase in commercial usage towards the centre of Maidstone, and more arable use on the outskirts.

History
Tovil is mentioned in the Cecil Papers with the leasing of a tenement at Tovil to Thomas Peene, commencing at Michaelmas, 1628. 

Tovil has a history of paper mills on the Loose Stream near the River Medway, which ceased operation in the 1980s. These included Great Ivy Mill, Hayle Mill, Upper Tovil Mill, Lower Tovil Mill and Bridge Mill. These and other mills located along the Loose Stream which flows through Tovil were formerly used for fulling, corn and in one case gunpowder. The Tovil Bridge connects Tovil to Barming over the Loose Stream and the Medway. 

The church of St Stephen was built in around 1840.  The architect was John Whichcord Snr. It was built of ragstone ashlar in the Early English style but demolished in about 1990.

Alabaster Passmore had an important printing works in Tovil and there were other small industries and a railway siding.

Modern Tovil
Many of the industrial units have since been replaced by housing. One notable local business is loudspeaker manufacturer KEF, which is based on Eccleston Road in Tovil. Goachers microbrewery is also based there.

Kent Fire and Rescue Service Headquarters is based in Tovil on Straw Mill Hill.

Governance
Tovil is in the South ward of Maidstone Borough Council, represented as of 2020 by three Liberal Democrat councillors. It is in the Maidstone South division of Kent County Council, represented as of 2020 by one Conservative councillor. The local MP is the Conservative, Helen Grant.

References

 

Civil parishes in Kent